The 1929 Utah Utes football team was an American football team that represented the University of Utah in the Rocky Mountain Conference (RMC) during the 1929 college football season. In their fifth season under head coach Ike Armstrong, the Utes compiled an overall record of 7–0 with a mark of 6–0 against conference opponents, won the RMC championship, shut out four of seven opponents, and outscored all opponents by a total of 219 to 23. The 1929 season was part of a 24-game unbeaten streak that began on November 12, 1927, and continued until September 26, 1931.

Bob Davis was the team captain. Two Utah players received recognition on the 1929 All-America team: tackle Alton Carman (3rd team, INS); and center Marvin Jones (3rd team, INS; 3rd team, Consolidated Press).

Schedule

References

Utah
Utah Utes football seasons
Rocky Mountain Athletic Conference football champion seasons
College football undefeated seasons
Utah Utes football